Lynda Cheryle Lyon Block (February 8, 1948 – May 10, 2002) was an American convicted murderer.

Background
Lynda Cheryle Lyon was born February 8, 1948, in Orlando, Florida, to Francis (Frank) Stephen Lyon and Berylene Elisabeth Owen. Lynda, and her sister Denyce (born 1952), lost their father when she was 10, when he died of heart failure. Lynda and her mother were never close, and Block claimed that her mother was both physically and mentally abusive.

Her second husband, George Sibley (September 8, 1942 – August 4, 2005), claimed that a constant trait of Block was charity. While living in Key West she served as Secretary of the Humane Society, and also as animal abuse investigator. She was also active in civic work besides her service to the Humane Society: for two years she served as president of the Friends of the Library in Key West and served as publicity director for a mayoral candidate.

Before the crime that led to her conviction and transfer to Alabama's death row, Block published Liberatis, a political magazine.

Crime
On October 4, 1993, Block's common-law husband, George Sibley, and Block's nine-year-old son were in a parked car in the parking lot of a Walmart store in Opelika, Alabama. A passer-by expressed concern for Block's son to Opelika Police Sergeant Roger Motley, saying it appeared to her as if the boy wanted help. She also believed the family could be living in the vehicle. At that time, Sibley and Block were on the run from the law in Florida after failing to appear for sentencing on an assault charge against Block's ex-husband. Motley found Sibley's car, parked behind and approached it, and asked for Sibley's license.

By Sibley's own account, he was explaining to Motley his personal theory that he was not required to have one, when he observed Motley placing his hand on his gun. Sibley then drew his gun and began shooting at Motley, who returned fire, wounding Sibley. Motley took cover behind his patrol car; witnesses stated Sibley fired first. Block was at a payphone when she heard the gunfire. She drew her gun and witnesses stated that she was in a crouched position when she fired. Block claimed that she fired just as she stopped running toward Motley. As Motley turned to face Block, she fired again, hitting him in the chest. Motley, who had given his bulletproof vest to another officer, was mortally wounded.

Part of an anti-government movement or "sovereign citizen movement", Block and Sibley had renounced their citizenship and destroyed their birth certificates, driver's licenses, and Social Security cards. They refused to cooperate with their court-appointed attorneys, maintaining that they had acted in self-defense. They also maintained that Alabama did not have the authority to try them as it was not properly re-admitted into the Union after the American Civil War. Although it could not be determined who fired the fatal shot, they were both convicted of capital murder and sentenced to death.

Death row
Block, Alabama Institutional Serial #Z575, entered death row on December 21, 1994. While on death row, she was held at the Julia Tutwiler Prison for Women in Wetumpka, Alabama.

Execution

Block was executed on May 10, 2002. Her execution occurred at the Holman Correctional Facility near Atmore, Alabama.

Before the execution, three friends visited Block for several hours. Block also saw a spiritual adviser. She had not requested a last meal, nor did she make a final statement. At approximately 12:00 midnight, she was placed in the electric chair and at 12:01 a.m., the current was turned on. At 12:10 a.m., she was pronounced dead. She was the last person to be electrocuted in Alabama and the first woman executed in the state since Rhonda Belle Martin in 1957.

Sibley filed a hand-written petition asking the Alabama Supreme Court to block his execution, claiming that Block had fired the shot that killed Motley. He was executed on August 4, 2005, by lethal injection.

See also

 Capital punishment in Alabama
 Capital punishment in the United States
 List of people executed in Alabama
 List of people executed in the United States in 2002
 List of women executed in the United States since 1976

References

External links

Clark County Prosecutor file on Lynda Lyon
Clark County Prosecutor file on George Sibley Jr.
Channel 12 interview with Lynda Lyon

1948 births
2002 deaths
1993 murders in the United States
Executed people from Florida
People from Orlando, Florida
People from Key West, Florida
21st-century executions by Alabama
American female murderers
American people executed for murdering police officers
People executed by Alabama by electric chair
Executed American women
People convicted of murder by Alabama
21st-century executions of American people
Sovereign citizen movement individuals